Shabnam Virmani is a documentary film maker and artist in residence at the Srishti School of Art, Design and Technology in Bangalore since 2002. Co-founder of the Drishti Media Arts and Human Rights collective, she has directed several documentaries, some of which have won awards. In 2002, she co-directed an award-winning community radio program with the Kutch Mahila Vikas Sangathan in Gujarat. She has performed Kabir's compositions in Rajasthan Kabir Yatra - a six-days long folk music festival and in Jashn-e-Rekhta.

Kabira Khada Bazaar Mein, a documentary film by Shabnam Virmani on the poet-saint as part of her Kabir Project, has won the Special Jury Prize at the 58th National Awards, June 2011.

She was conferred this award for,"An insightful film that introduces us to the various cults that have grown around Kabir, the mystic weaver and saint. It explores the nuances of India's argumentative tradition as exemplified by Kabir's dohas and traces the eventful journey of one man caught in an Orwellian dilemma as he is elevated to the status of a cult leader, torn between the inevitable trappings of hierarchy that run paradoxical to the simple philosophy of Kabir".

Awards and nominations

Had-Anhad (Bounded-Boundless)
Journeys with Ram and Kabir

 1st Prize (shared), One Billion Eyes Documentary Film Festival, August 2009, Chennai
 Mahindra Indo-American Arts Council Film Festival, 5–9 November, New York City
 World Performing Arts Festival, Nov 2008, Lahore, Pakistan
 Bangalore International Film Festival, Jan 2009, Bangalore, India
 Kala Ghoda Festival, Feb 2009, Mumbai
 Inaugural film, VIBGYOR International Film Festival, Feb 2009, Thrissur, Kerala, India

Chalo Hamara Des (Come to My Country)
Journeys with Kabir and Friends
 One Billion Eyes Documentary Film Festival, August 2008, Chennai, India
 World Performing Arts Festival, Nov 2008, Lahore, Pakistan
 International Festival of Sacred Arts, Feb 2009 Delhi, India
 VIBGYOR International Film Festival, Feb 2009, Thrissur, Kerala, India

Koi Sunta Hai (Someone Listens)
Journeys with Kumar and Kabir
 One Billion Eyes Documentary Film Festival, August 2008, Chennai, India
 World Performing Arts Festival, Nov 2008, Lahore, Pakistan
 VIBGYOR International Film Festival, Feb 2009, Thrissur, Kerala, India

Kabira Khada Bazaar Mein (In the Market Stands Kabir)
Journeys with Kabir and Friends
 Special Jury Prize at the 58th National Awards, India, June 2011.

When Women Unite:The Story of an Uprising/Aadavallu Ekamaite
 Grand Prize, 6th Tokyo Global Environmental Film Festival, 1997.
 Chingari Video Festival, Conference on South Asian Studies, University of Wisconsin, Madison, USA, 1996
 Margaret Mead International Film Festival, New York City, 1997
 Margaret Mead Travelling Film and Video Festival, 1997–98
 Film South Asia, Kathmandu, Nepal, 1997
 5th Mumbai International Film Festival, 1998
 Sakshi Film Festival, Bangalore, 1998
 Prakriti Film Festival, Pune, 1999
 New Delhi Video Festival, 1999

Tu Zinda Hai!/You Are Alive!
 Awarded Best Film in the Society & Development Category, International Video Festival (IVFEST), Thiruvananthapuram, 1995
 Yamagata International Documentary Film Festival, Japan, 1997
 Chingari Video Festival, Conference of South Asian Studies, University of Wisconsin, Madison, USA, 1997
 Film South Asia, Kathmandu, Nepal, 1997
 Prakriti Film Festival, Hyderabad, 1997
 Fribourg International Film Festival, Switzerland, 1998

Umati Umang ni Damri/Hopes Soaring High
 Mumbai International Film Festival, Video Vista, 1996
 Margaret Mead International Film Festival, New York, 1996
 Margaret Mead Travelling Film Festival, USA, 1996–97

Kunjal Paanje Kutch Ji (Sarus Crane of our Kutch)
Radio production
 Chameli Devi Jain Award for Women in Journalism, March 2001

Notes

External links
Drishti Media Arts and Human Rights collective

Indian women film directors
Indian women journalists
Living people
Cornell University alumni
Indian women documentary filmmakers
20th-century Indian film directors
Film directors from Bangalore
Year of birth missing (living people)
21st-century Indian film directors
21st-century Indian women artists
21st-century Indian women writers
21st-century Indian writers
21st-century Indian journalists
20th-century Indian women